Chapter Two, Chapter 2, or Chapter II may refer to:

Film, television, and theatre
Chapter Two (play), a 1977 play by Neil Simon
Chapter Two (film), a 1979 adaptation of Neil Simon's play

Television episodes
"Chapter 2" (American Horror Story)
"Chapter 2" (House of Cards)
"Chapter 2" (Legion)
"Chapter 2: The Child", an episode of The Mandalorian
"Chapter 2: The Tribes of Tatooine", an episode of The Book of Boba Fett
Three episodes of Dear White People:
"Chapter II" (Dear White People season 1)
"Chapter II" (Dear White People season 2)
"Chapter II" (Dear White People season 3)
"Chapter Two" (Boston Public)
"Chapter Two: A Touch of Evil", an episode of Riverdale
"Chapter Two: The Deep End", an episode of Special
Three episodes of Stranger Things:
"Chapter Two: The Weirdo on Maple Street", season 1
"Chapter Two: Trick or Treat, Freak", season 2
"Chapter Two: The Mall Rats", season 3

Music
Chapter 2 (g.o.d album), 1999
Chapter 2: The Voice, an album by Syleena Johnson, 2002
Chapter 2: World Domination, an album by Three 6 Mafia, 1997
Chapter II (Ashanti album), 2003
Chapter II (Benga album), 2013
Chapter II: Family Reunion, an album by Mo Thugs, 1998
Chapter II, an EP by the Audition, 2012
Chapter Two (Roberta Flack album), 1970
Chapter Two (Sacred System album), 1997
Chapter Two (Viking Skull album), 2007
Chapter Two: Hasta Siempre, an album by Gato Barbieri, 1974
Chapter Two: Red, an EP by Bea Miller, 2017

Other uses
In the Patent Cooperation Treaty, the prosecution procedure when a demand under Article 31 PCT is made
ECW Chapter 2, a 1997 professional wrestling event.
Al-Baqarah, the second chapter of Quran

See also

Chapter (books)
Second Chapter, an album by Danny Kirwan, 1975